Posca was an Ancient Roman drink made by mixing wine vinegar and water. Bracing but less nutritious and palatable than wine, it was typically a drink for soldiers, the lower classes, and slaves.

Etymology and later elaborations

The word posca is derived from either the Latin potor ("to drink") or from the Greek epoxos ("very sharp"). As the Greeks lacked a word for posca, sources written in Greek, such as Plutarch and the Gospels, use the word οξος (oxos, "vinegar") in its place (translated as acetum in the Vulgate Bible). The word eventually migrated into Greek from about the sixth century AD onwards as the Byzantine army continued the Roman tradition, drinking what they termed phouska. This word (sometimes rendered phoukas) may in some contexts mean beer.What it certainly meant originally, like Latin posca, was vinegar-and-water, the regular beverage of the classical Roman army on bad days. Thus Aetius gives, and Paul of Aegina repeats, a recipe for a "palatable and laxative phouska" which includes cumin, fennel seed, pennyroyal, celery seed, anise, thyme, scammony and salt to be added to the basic liquid, which is explicitly called oxykraton "vinegar diluted with water."

Usage

The widespread use of posca is attested by numerous mentions by ancient sources ranging from the Natural History of Pliny the Elder to the comedies of Plautus. When on campaign, generals and emperors could show their solidarity with common soldiers by drinking posca, as did Cato the Elder (as recorded by Plutarch) and the emperor Hadrian, who according to the Historia Augusta "actually led a soldier’s life […] and, after the example of Scipio Aemilianus, Metellus, and his own adoptive father Trajan, cheerfully ate out of doors such camp-fare as bacon, cheese and vinegar." A decree of AD 360 ordered that lower ranks of the army should drink posca and wine on alternate days.

Girolamo Cardano, in his Encomium Neronis of 1562, attributed the superiority of the Roman armies to only three factors: the great quantities of levies, their sturdiness and ability to carry heavy weights due to training, and good foods such as salted pork, cheese, and the use of posca as a drink.

See also
Holy Sponge
Kombucha
Oxymel
Sekanjabin
Switchel

Notes

Roman cuisine
Historical drinks
Ancient wine
Vinegar